Iridium tetrachloride is an inorganic compound with the approximate formula IrCl4(H2O)n.  It is a water-soluble dark brown amorphous solid.  A well defined derivative is ammonium hexachloroiridate ((NH4)2IrCl6).   It is used to prepare catalysts, such as the Henbest Catalyst for transfer hydrogenation of cyclohexanones.

References

Iridium compounds
Chloro complexes